The 2008 Clásica de San Sebastián, the 28th edition of the Clásica de San Sebastián road cycling race took place on August 2, 2008 in Spain and was won by Spaniard Alejandro Valverde of  in a sprint finish on the Donostia avenue. He held off Russian Alexandr Kolobnev of Team CSC Saxo Bank and Italian Davide Rebellin of Gerolsteiner, from a group that had shrunk to less than 15 riders. Rebellin tried several times to avoid a sprint, but the winner of 1997 could not get away.

General Standings

See also
2008 in road cycling

External links
2008 Clásica de San Sebastián on UCI website

2008
2008 UCI ProTour
San